The Canterbury Pilgrims is an opera by the American composer Reginald De Koven. It premiered at the Metropolitan Opera House on March 8, 1917 just as the US was on the verge of declaring war on Germany. The unfolding world events caused its cancellation after just five performances. The libretto, written by Percy MacKaye, is loosely based on Geoffrey Chaucer's The Canterbury Tales.

Roles

Synopsis

Place: England.
Time: April, 1387.

The story has to do with the merry schemes of the Wife of Bath, who has fallen in love with Chaucer who in his turn loves the Prioress, and of her winning of a bet to gain possession of a certain brooch which carries with it Chaucer's promise of marriage. He is finally rescued by Richard II who decides that the Wife may marry a sixth time only on condition that she marry a miller. A devoted miller joyfully accepts the opportunity and the Prioress and Chaucer are reconciled.

Notes

References

The Opera Goer's Complete Guide by Leo Melitz, 1921 version.
The Complete Opera Book by Gustav Kobbé, 1919 version.

External links
Libretto
Vocal Score

Operas
1917 operas
English-language operas
Opera world premieres at the Metropolitan Opera
Operas set in England
Operas based on novels
Works based on The Canterbury Tales